Listen is the second studio album by American singer Terry Dexter. It was released by Penny's Gang Records on September 30, 2008. Her first album in nine years, it peaked at number 43 on the US Top R&B/Hip-Hop Albums chart.

Track listing

Charts

Release history

References

2008 albums
Terry Dexter albums